Kennedy (also spelled Kenedi, Kennedie, Kennedi) is a unisex given name in the English language. The name is an Anglicised form of a masculine given name in the Irish language.

Etymology
According to Patrick Hanks and Flavia Hodges, the given name Kennedy is an Anglicised form of Cinnéidigh, a masculine given name in the Irish language. This Irish name is composed of two elements: the first, ceann, means "head"; the second, éidigh, means "ugly". According to Patrick Woulfe, who wrote in the early 19th century, Kennedy or Kynidi is an Anglicised form the Irish Cinnéididh and Cinnéidigh. Woulfe derived these Irish names from two elements: the first, ceann, meaning "a head"; the second, éide, meaning "Armour"; hence the name can be thought to mean "helmet-headed".

Other languages
As a masculine given name, Kennedy can be rendered into Irish as Cinnéididh and Cinnéidigh, and into Latin as Kinnedius. The masculine Kennedy can be rendered into Scottish Gaelic as Uarraig. This name is etymologically unrelated to the English Kennedy and Irish Cinnéidigh. Uarraig is composed of two Scottish Gaelic elements: the first, uall, means "pride"; and the second, garg, means "fierce". This Scottish Gaelic name is Anglicised Kennedy possibly because it was commonly borne by various families who bore the surname Kennedy. One such family, according tradition dating from the 18th century, descended from a man who bore a form of this name, and settled in Lochaber in the 16th century.

Popularity and use
Throughout the English-speaking world, the given name Kennedy has sometimes been used in honour of John F. Kennedy, the 35th President of the United States, who was assassinated in 1963, and his brother Robert F. Kennedy, who was assassinated in 1968.

In the United States of America, Kennedy, has been among the top 1,000 names recorded in Social Security card applications, in the last 10 years, for both baby boys and girls. As a masculine name, Kennedy first appeared amongst the top 1,000 names in 1960, but fell out of the top 1,000 after 1968. The name did not re-enter the top 1,000 until 1994, where it stayed until 2005. At its height, Kennedy was ranked the 516th most popular masculine baby name in 1964. As a feminine name, Kennedy first appeared among the top 1,000 names in 1994, where it has remained ever since. Its peak it was ranked the 110th most popular feminine baby name in 2007. As of 2009 it was the 114th most popular. In 1990, the United States Census Bureau undertook a study of the 1990 United States Census, and released a sample of data concerning the most popular names. According to this sample of 6.3 million people (who had 5,494 unique first names), Kennedy did not even appear among the 4,275 feminine names, or the 1,219 masculine names.

Popularity charts

People
Notable people with the given name or nickname Kennedy include:

Males with the name
Kennedy Agyapong (born 1960), Ghanaian politician and businessman
Ken Anderson (wrestler) (born 1976), known professionally as Mr. Kennedy, American professional wrestler
Kennedy Ashia (born 1993), Ghanaian professional football player
Kennedy Baker (born 1996), American former gymnast
Kennedy Bakircioglu (born 1980), Swedish former football player
Kennedy Asamoah Boateng (born 1989), Ghanaian professional football player
Kennedy Kofi Boateng (born 1993), Ghanaian professional football player
Kennedy Brooks (born 1998), American football player
Kennedy Francis Burns (1842–1895), Canadian politician and businessman
Kennedy Chandler (born 2002), American basketball player
Kennedy Chihuri (born 1969), Zimbabwean former football player
 Reuben Asberry Jr., professionally known as Kennedy Davenport, American drag queen
Kennedy Edwin (born 1976), Malaysian musician
Kennedy Eriba (born 1990), Nigerian professional football player
 Kennedy William Gordy (born 1964), professionally known as Rockwell, American former singer
Kennedy Graham (born 1946), New Zealand politician
Kennedy Hinkson (born 1986), Trinidad and Tobago professional football player
Kennedy Igboananike (born 1989), Nigerian professional football player
Kennedy Ihenacho (born 1990), Nigerian professional football player
Kennedy Izuka, American soccer player
Kennedy Jones (journalist) (1865–1921), British journalist
Kennedy Jones (musician) (1900–1990), American musician
Kennedy Musyoka Kalonzo (born 1987), Kenyan politician and lawyer
Kennedy Kanyanta (born 1979), Zambian professional boxer
Kennedy Katende (born 1985), Ugandan-Swedish amateur boxer
Kennedy Kimwetich (born 1973), Kenyan former runner
Kennedy Kithuka (born 1989), Kenyan-American runner
Kennedy Lindsay (1927–1997), British politician
Kennedy Macdonald (1847–1914), New Zealand politician
Kennedy Malunga (born 1970), Malawian professional football player
 Kennedy McArthur (1881–1960), known as Ken McArthur, Irish track and field athlete
Kennedy McIntosh (1949–2009), American professional basketball player
Kennedy McKinney (born 1966), American former professional boxer
Kennedy Meeks (born 1995), American professional basketball player
Kennedy Moretti (born 1966), Brazilian pianist
Kennedy Mudenda (born 1988), Zambian professional football player
Kennedy Mweene (born 1984), Zambian professional football player
Kennedy Nagoli (born 1973), Zimbabwean former professional football player
Kennedy Nketani (born 1984), Zambian professional football player
Kennedy Nkeyasen (born 1976), Ghanaian former professional soccer player
Kennedy Ugoala Nwanganga (born 1990), Nigerian professional football player
Kennedy Osei Nyarko (born 1979), Ghanaian politician
Kennedy Ochieng (born 1971), Kenyan former sprinter
Kennedy Odede, Kenyan entrepreneur
Kennedy Mong'are Okong'o (born 1969), Kenyan politician
Kennedy Okonkwo (born 1977), Nigerian businessman
Kennedy Omogi (born 1983)
Kennedy Ondiek (1966–2011), Kenyan runner
Kennedy J. P. Orton (1872–1930), British chemist
Kennedy Osei (born 1966), Ghanaian former runner
Kennedy Otieno (born 1972), Kenyan former professional cricketer
Kennedy Polamalu (born 1963), American football coach and former college football player
Kennedy L. Potter (died 1933), American politician
Kennedy J. Reed, American physicist
Kennedy Russell (1883–1954), British composer
Kennedy Simmonds (born 1936), Saint Kitts and Nevis politician
Kennedy St-Pierre (born 1992), Mauritian professional boxer
Kennedy Stewart (Canadian politician) (born 1966), Canadian politician
Kennedy Stewart (Irish politician) (1882–1964), Irish politician
Kennedy Thomson (1936–1996), British television presenter
Kennedy Trevaskis (1915–1990), British colonial official and army officer
Kennedy Tsimba (born 1974), South African professional rugby coach and former player
Kennedy Venkersammy (born 1951), Guyanese former professional cricketer
 Kennedy John Victor (born 1966), professionally known as Vikram, Indian actor
Kennedy Winston (born 1984), American professional basketball player
Kennedy Wong (born 1963), Hong Kong solicitor

Females with the name
Kennedy Burke (born 1997), American professional basketball player
Kennedy Faulknor (born 1999), Canadian soccer player
Kennedy Fraser (born 1948), American writer
Kennedy Goss (born 1996), Canadian competitive swimmer
Kennedy Holmes, American singer
Kennedy Marchment (born 1996), Canadian professional ice hockey player
Kennedy McMann (born 1996), American actress
 Lisa Kennedy Montgomery (born 1972), known mononymously as Kennedy, American political commentator
Kennedy Summers (born 1987), American model and actress

References

See also
List of Irish-language given names

Irish masculine given names
English-language unisex given names
Scottish Gaelic unisex given names